Megalictis is an extinct genus of large predatory mustelids that existed in North America during the "cat gap" from the Late Arikareean (Ar4) in the Miocene epoch.

History of discovery
The genus Megalictis was first described by W. D. Matthew in 1907, and assigned to the family Mustelidae. Two similar genera discovered at the same time, Aelurocyon (Peterson, 1907) and Paroligobunis (Peterson, 1910) were identified as synonymous with Megalictis in 1996 though Paroligobunis was re-established as a separate genus in 1998. P. R. Bjork, in 1970, assigned the genus to the subfamily Mellivorinae, whilst J. A. Baskin reassigned it to Oligobuninae in 1998. Three species have been identified in the genus: M. ferox, M. petersoni, and M. frazieri, whilst two more, Megalictis brevifacies and Megalictis simplicidens, have since been determined to be synonymous with M. ferox. Other synonyms of M. ferox include Aelurocyon brevifacies, Brachypsalis simplicidens and Paroligobunis simplicidens.

Specimens of M. ferox have been found at ten sites in South Dakota, Nebraska and Wyoming, dated to the Harrisonian period - from 24.8 to 20.6 million years ago. The 19 specimens so far identified have a wide range of sizes, which is believed to be evidence of extreme sexual dimorphism, a phenomenon where males and females of the species will grow to different sizes; a 1996 study rejected the possibility of multiple "morphologically uniform" but differently sized species as unlikely. However, later studies identified significant morphological variation in the joints of the forearms, which would not be consistent with sexual dimorphism. Andersson suggests that the identification of all of these as a single species may need revision.

Description
 
Megalictis reached the size of a modern jaguar and was one of the largest terrestrial mustelids ever recorded. The skull of Megalictis ferox was as long as of jaguar but wider, almost as of the black bear. It had a powerful bite force, allowing it to crush bones of the large prey, as modern hyenas and jaguars can. Megalictis surpassed in size other mustelids like Ekorus, Eomellivora,  and Plesiogulo. Matthew described it as having short stout legs, with short feet and long non-retractible claws, similar to a modern ferret but about twice the size, and noted that "the teeth indicate an animal fully as predaceous as the wolverine, but the skeleton points to more fossorial habits". Research comparing the joints of the forelegs to modern mammalian carnivores suggests that it waited in ambush and grappled with its prey, rather than hunting it down by pursuit like a modern cheetah.

References

Sources

 

Prehistoric mustelids
Miocene mustelids
Miocene mammals of North America
White River Fauna
Fossil taxa described in 1907
Prehistoric carnivoran genera